We Have the Right to Remain Violent is the sixth album by American rap group South Central Cartel. Havikk The Rhime Son is not featured in any songs.

Track listing 
 Intro
 The War Is On (featuring 40 Glocc)
 My Hood Yo Hood (featuring Daz Dillinger)
 Imagine that
 Up in Here
 G'z Run the Blocc
 Cadillac Dee (Skit)
 Thug Thang
 Hood Iz Callin'
 Doin It (Skit)
 Bacc Up
 Fakes
 Micky D's (Skit)
 West Coast Riders
 Cadillac Dee (Skit 2)
 After Hours
 Shake 'Em Off
 Follow Me
 Cartel Hataz
 Dippin'
 Half Azz Geez
 Non Stop
 Game
 M-Rights
 No Joke
 That's My Shit (featuring Jaz-Mina)

2002 albums
South Central Cartel albums
Albums produced by Prodeje